Curtis Omar McMahon (January 26, 1915 – April 28, 1978) was an American professional basketball player. He played in the National Basketball League for the Dayton Metropolitans during the 1937–38 season and averaged 1.9 points per game. In his post-basketball life, McMahon worked as a toolmaker for 32 years.

References

1915 births
1978 deaths
American men's basketball players
Basketball players from Ohio
Dayton Metropolitans players
Guards (basketball)
People from Lawrence County, Ohio